Instauration was a monthly magazine published by white supremacist Sumner Humphrey Ireland, under the pen-name "Wilmot Robertson". Robertson's work was funded by Wickliffe Draper's Pioneer Fund.

The magazine was described as being hostile to African-Americans, Jews, immigrants, and the LGBT community. Mitch Berbrier, in an article titled "Impression Management for the Thinking Racist", described the magazine as an attempt "to present an intellectualized rhetoric of racism and white supremacy".

References

1975 establishments in Florida
2000 disestablishments in Florida
Anti-black racism in the United States
Antisemitism in the United States
Defunct political magazines published in the United States
English-language magazines
Eugenics in the United States
Holocaust denial in the United States
Magazines established in 1975
Magazines disestablished in 2000
Magazines published in Florida
Monthly magazines published in the United States
White nationalism in the United States
White supremacy in the United States